The 2013 Wofford Terriers football team represented Wofford College in the 2013 NCAA Division I FCS football season. They were led by 26th year head coach Mike Ayers and played their home games at Gibbs Stadium. They were a member of the Southern Conference. They finished the season 5–6, 4–4 in SoCon play to finish in a four way tie for fourth place.

Schedule

Source: Schedule

Ranking movements

References

Wofford
Wofford Terriers football seasons
Wofford Terriers football